Eelco Gelling (born 12 June 1946) is a Dutch blues guitarist. Gelling played with Cuby + Blizzards (which he co-founded together with Harry Muskee) until 1976.

Cuby + Blizzards (1966–1974)
Cuby + Blizzards (C+B) was founded by Eelco Gelling and Harry Muskee in 1964. Their first single was released in 1965 followed by a string of albums starting in 1966. During his time with Cuby + Blizzards the band became famous in Holland, Germany and the UK. 
They played, recorded and toured with Eddie Boyd, Van Morrison and Alexis Korner. In 1966 they toured with John Mayall and when Mayall came over to the Netherlands to stay for a couple of days, he asked Gelling to join the Bluesbreakers. Gelling did not agree and stayed with Cuby + Blizzards. 
The 1969 album Appleknockers Flophouse is considered one of the greatest Dutch Blues albums. The guitar work rivals that of many great players like Eric Clapton, Peter Green and Mick Taylor.
The band recorded their last album in 1974, named Het Afscheidsconcert (The Farewell Concert). Harry Muskee and Eelco formed Red, White 'n Blue but after two singles and an album reunited with Herman Brood in 1976 for a short period to record two more Cuby albums Kid Blue and Old times, Good times. In the early 1990s C+B was re-formed this time without Gelling.

Golden Earring (1977-1979)
In 1977, he joined Golden Earring who he played with for several years. He first appeared as a fully fledged member on "Contraband" (released in the U.S. under the title "Mad Love"). Eelco's haunting slide work is highlighted on the tracks "Sueleen" and "Bombay". While out on tour the group recorded their first live album "Golden Earring Live". Eelco helps the group deliver many of their classics including an extended version of the group's smash hit "Radar Love". Gelling also plays on the group's "Grab it for a Second" album. During a tour in the United States he left the band; after discussions about musical style and after his favorite guitar (a Gibson Les Paul) was stolen from a cab in New York, he quit Golden Earring and went back to the Netherlands.

80's and 90's
When Eelco returned to Holland, Harry Muskee asked him to join the Muskee Gang, during a recording session Eelco was fired and left for The Hague to join the Freelance band.
He played in several bands and after a few years started his own, the Eelco Gelling Band.

2000's and onwards
In 2000 Eelco joined The Hague local band, Xray for a show in Doornroosje in Nijmegen. A live recording with two original songs was released in early 2001.

On 25 June 2010 the Eelco Gelling Band performed for the last time, since then the band continued as Kroppo's Blues Band, without Gelling.

In 2010, C+B Classic, Window of my eyes was used in the movie The American featuring George Clooney.

In 2012, Eelco appeared in the documentary 'Gitaar Jongens' (Guitar Guys) by Henny Vrienten. Eelco was interviewed at home and appeared on stage at the Royal Carre to play with Jan Akkerman. Eelco hadn't played for a couple of years and has since been working to get back in shape.
In 2013 and 2014, Jan Akkerman asked Eelco to join him for some shows in Zoetermeer and Groningen.

On April 14, 2015, Eelco was inducted in the Dutch Blues Hall of Fame and presented with a trophy by former C+B manager Johan Derksen. He also received a 45-year-overdue Gold Record for Groeten uit Grolloo. Eelco played a surprise set with Ruben Hoeke and Raymond van Kuijen.

On April 29, 2015, Eelco opened the exposition, "Eelco Gelling, Geweldenaar op de Gitaar" (Savage or Giant on Guitar) at the C+B Museum in Grolloo.

Guitars and amps
Eelco's favorite guitar is his longtime companion the famous sunburst 1960 Gibson Les Paul. Eelco has owned this guitar since the early Cuby days when he traded his Gibson ES-330 for it. The guitar has been stolen, broken, abused and was recently restored to former glory. Eelco used a Fender Concert (4x10) or a Marshall 100 watt stack to amplify his guitar. In the 1980s, when Eelco played with Blues Connection, he usually resorted to playing on his Acoustic Control Corporation Model 165 combo. After departing from Blues Connection in the early 1990s, Eelco started using both the Koch KC50 and the Koch Multitone amplifiers. Recently he has switched back to Marshalls and now uses a small Marshall Class 5 combo.

Discography

Singles with Cuby and the Blizzards

|- align=center ||
|align=left| Stumble And Fall/I'm So Restless || 1965 || - || - || - || -
|- align=center ||
|align=left| LSD Got A Million Dollars/Your Body Not Your Soul || 1966 || - || - || - || -
|- align=center ||
|align=left| Back Home/Sweet Mary || 1966 || 17-09-1966 || 33 || 4 || Philips
|- align=center ||
|align=left| Richard Cory/You Don't Know || 1966 || - || - || - || -
|- align=center ||
|align=left| Just For Fun/Things I Remember || 1967 || 18-03-1967 || 34 || 4 || Philips
|- align=center ||
|align=left| Another Day, Another Road/Feeling Like A Suitcase || 1967 || 15-07-1967 || 20 || 7 || Philips
|- align=center ||
|align=left| Distant Smile/Don't Know Which Way To Go || 1967 || 16-12-1967 || 20 || 6 || -
|- align=center ||
|align=left| The Sunshine Of Your Shadow/Crying Tears || 1967 || - || - || - || -
|- align=center ||
|align=left| Another Land/Somebody Will Know Someday || 1967 || - || - || - || -
|- align=center ||
|align=left| Window Of My Eyes/Checkin' Up On My Baby || 1968 || 28-09-1968 || 10 || 10 || Philips
|- align=center ||
|align=left| Nostalgic Toilet/116 a Queensway || 1968 || - || - || - || -
|- align=center ||
|align=left| Appleknockers Flophouse/Because Of Illness || 1969 || - || - || - || -
|- align=center ||
|align=left| Thursday Night/Wee Wee Baby || 1970 || - || - || - || -
|- align=center ||
|align=left| Backstreet/Easy To Leave Hard To Forget || 1971 || - || - || - || -
|- align=center ||
|align=left| Pawnbroker/Straight No Chaser || 1972 || - || - || - || -
|- align=center ||
|align=left| Sometimes/Every Time || 1972 || - || - || - || -
|- align=center ||
|align=left| Kid Blue/Perfect Song || 1976 || - || - || - || -
|- align=center ||
|align=left| Going To The City/Maybe We Need || 1977 || - || - || - || -
|}

Albums with Cuby and the Blizzards

|- align=center ||
|align=left| Desolation || 1966 || - || - || - || -
|- align=center ||
|align=left| Praise The Blues || 1967 || met Eddie Boyd - || - || - || -
|- align=center ||
|align=left| Groeten Uit Grollo || 1967 || - || - || - || -
|- align=center ||
|align=left| Trippin' Thru' A Midnight Blues || 1968 || - || - || - || -
|- align=center ||
|align=left| Live! At Düsseldorf || 1968 || met Alexis Korner - || - || - || -
|- align=center ||
|align=left| On The Road || 1968 || - || - || - || -
|- align=center ||
|align=left| Cuby's Blues || 1969 || - || - || - || -
|- align=center ||
|align=left| Appleknockers Flophouse || 1969 || - || - || - || -
|- align=center ||
|align=left| Too Blind To See || 1970 || - || - || - || -
|- align=center ||
|align=left| King Of The World || 1970 || - || - || - || -
|- align=center ||
|align=left| Simple Man || 1971 || - || - || - || -
|- align=center ||
|align=left| Sometimes || 1972 || - || - || - || -
|- align=center ||
|align=left| Ballads || 1973 || - || - || - || -
|- align=center ||
|align=left| Afscheidsconcert || 1974 || - || - || - || -
|- align=center ||
|align=left| Kid Blue || 1976 || - || - || - || -
|- align=center ||
|align=left| Old Times Good Times || 1977 || - || - || - || -
|- align=center ||
|align=left| The Forgotten Tapes || 1979 || - || - || - || -
|- align=center ||
|align=left| Featuring Herman Brood Live || 1979 || - || - || - || -
|- align=center ||
|align=left| Blues Traveller || 2000 || 4-cd - || - || - || -
|}

Singles with The Tower

|- align=center ||
|align=left| In Your Life/Slow Motion Mind || 1968 || - || - || - || -
|- align=center ||
|align=left| Captain Decker/Steps into space || 1969 || - || - || - || -
|- align=center ||
|}

Singles with Red White 'n Blue

|- align=center ||
|align=left| Master Of Planning/Pigeon Girl || 1975 || - || - || - || -
|- align=center ||
|align=left| Happyville/ Country Life || 1976 || - || - || - || -
|- align=center ||
|}

Albums with Red White 'n Blue

|- align=center ||
|align=left| Red White 'n Blue || 1975 || - || - || - || -
|}

Singles with Golden Earring

|- align=center ||
|align=left| Radar Love Live || 1977 || - || - || - || -
|- align=center ||
|align=left| Movin' Down Life/Can't Talk Now || 1978 || - || - || - || -
|- align=center ||
|}

Albums with Golden Earring

|- align=center ||
|align=left| Contraband || 1977 || - || - || - || -
|- align=center ||
|align=left| Live || 1977 || - || - || - || -
|- align=center ||
|align=left| Grab It For A Second || 1978 || - || - || - || -
|}

Albums with Freelance Band

|- align=center ||
|align=left| Rough 'n' Tough || 1980 || - || - || - || -
|}

Albums with the Muskee Gang

|- align=center ||
|align=left| Rimshots In The Dark || 1986 || - || - || - || -
|}

Albums with Blues Connection

|- align=center ||
|align=left| Featuring Eelco Gelling || 1988 || - || - || - || -
|}

Solo albums

|- align=center ||
|align=left| The Missing Link || 2000 || dubbel cd || - || - || -
|}

Albums with Eelco Gelling Band

|- align=center
|align=left| On The Road || 2005 || - || - || - || -
|}

References

External links

Dutch guitarists
Dutch male guitarists
1946 births
Living people
People from Zwartewaterland
Golden Earring members